The 1951 Connecticut Huskies football team represented the University of Connecticut in the 1951 college football season.  The Huskies were led by second year head coach Arthur Valpey, and completed the season with a record of 4–4.

Schedule

References

Connecticut
UConn Huskies football seasons
Connecticut Huskies football